Back for the Future is the second studio album by Dom and Roland, released in 2002.

Track listing

 Dom & Roland - "Can't Punish Me"
 Dom & Roland - "Killa Bullet"
 Dom & Roland - "Sky Spirits"
 
 Dom & Rymetyme - "Wee Gee"
 Dom & Roland - "Parasite"
 Dom & Roland - "Chaos Edit"
 Dom & Optical - "Rage Roll"
 Cyba Space - "Life (Dom & Roland Remix)" 		
 Current Affairs feat. Dom - "The Voyage"
 Dom & Roland - "Clip Kill"
 Dom & Roland - "Soundwall (VIP)"
 Dom & Keaton - "Archaeon"
 Dom & Rymetyme - "Iceberg"
 Dom & Roland - "Firewire"
 Current Affairs feat. Dom - "Sand Gun"
 Dom & Keaton - "Twisted City"
 Dom & Keaton- "Mordor"
 Biostacis - "Menace (Dom & Roland Remix)"
 Dom & Roland - "Imagination (VIP)"
 
 Dom & Kemal - "Moulin Rouge"

References

External links

2002 albums
Dom & Roland albums